The 2014–15 Philippine Basketball Association (PBA) Philippine Cup Finals was the best-of-7 championship series of the 2014–15 PBA Philippine Cup, and the conclusion of the conference's playoffs. The San Miguel Beermen and the Alaska Aces competed for the 37th All-Filipino championship and the 113th overall championship contested by the league.

Background

Road to the finals

Head-to-head matchup

Series summary
*overtime

Game 1

In the first quarter of Game One the San Miguel manage to have a double digit 27–5, but then on the second half of the game Alaska's Abueva and Hontiveros makes a scoring run to make a comeback. Then in overtime Alaska outscored the Beermen to steal Game One 88–82.

Game 2

This is the physical game of the series featuring two Kapampangan superstars Arwind santos and Calvin Abueva. In the game Abueva elbowed Santos on the rebound, due to Santos blood he was forced to rest before coming back late in the third quarter to lead the Beermen to a scoring run and avoid Alaska's possible comeback.

Game 3

On Game Three SMB manage once again to manage big 20 or more points on three quarters, but the Aces prove again their resiliency to comeback outscoring the Beermen in fourth quarter 32–6.

Game 4

Prior to the start of Game Four June Mar Fajardo received his second straight Best Player of the Conference in Philippine Cup. Alex Cabagnot finally break his silence in the series tallying team high 22 points and gave the Beermen a dominant game once again.

Game 5

This game of this series was proved to be the closest scoring since the last four games, it was a see-saw battle the score was being tied after all three quarters. But on the fourth quarter the Beermen relied on their bench to make an opening scoring run on fourth quarter and win the game after great performances of Arwind Santos and June Mar Fajardo combining for 38 points and 10 blocks(19 points each and 5 blocks each). This also served as the first time the Beermen leads the series for pivotal 3–2 lead.

Game 6

The San Miguel once again manage to have double digit lead in the first quarter but then on the second to the fourth quarter the Alaska have controlled the whole behind a great performance from the former Beermen Dondon Hontiveros.

Game 7

  
The San Miguel and Alaska battled for their third Game Seven of their other previous PBA finals  meeting which Alaska winning twice of the two games seven meeting. This game was started in the first quarter by Fajardo's amazing euro step Sonny Thoss before the Beeremen lead the Aces a double digit point lead after great shooting from Arwind Santos. The San Miguel lead Alaska dominantly 48–27 at the half. But the Aces again proved their great comeback led by Calvin Abueva came close after third quarter 62–59, but on fourth quarter the Alaska steal the lead and lead as many as 6 points under 4 minutes remaining in the game 74–68. The Beeremen then make their own rally having 12–6 run then with one minute remaining in the game and the clock is winding down Arwind Santos makes a crucial three pointer with 43 seconds remaining in the game to push San Miguel lead back to one 79–78 then he grabbed also a crucial defensive rebound after Sonny Thoss missed a shot over Fajardo. In the one possession after Abueva missed a floater Ronald Tubid grabs a defensive rebound but call a time out that SMB doesn't have any more. Dondon Hontiveros then missed a crucial technical free throw, on the last play were San Miguel has the ball Chris Lutz inbound the ball to June Mar Fajardo who had been forced to a jumpball by Abueva. On the jumpball Abueva won the tip over Fajardo and the ball goes to Thoss who finds Jvee Casio for game winning three pointer but his shot missed before the buzzer sounded.

Rosters

{| class="toccolours" style="font-size: 95%; width: 100%;"
|-
! colspan="2" style="background-color: #; color: #; text-align: center;" | San Miguel Beermen 2014–15 PBA Philippine Cup roster
|- style="background-color:#; color: #; text-align: center;"
! Players !! Coaches
|-
| valign="top" |
{| class="sortable" style="background:transparent; margin:0px; width:100%;"
! Pos. !! # !! POB !! Name !! Height !! Weight !! !! College 
|-

{| class="toccolours" style="font-size: 95%; width: 100%;"
|-
! colspan="2" style="background-color: #; color: #; text-align: center;" | Alaska Aces 2014–15 PBA Philippine Cup roster
|- style="background-color:#; color: #; text-align: center;"
! Players !! Coaches
|-
| valign="top" |
{| class="sortable" style="background:transparent; margin:0px; width:100%;"
! Pos. !! # !! POB !! Name !! Height !! Weight !! !! College 
|-

 

  also serves as Alaska's board governor.

Broadcast notes
All of the games were aired live on TV5, AksyonTV and Fox Sports, except for Game 5 that was delayed at TV5 and AksyonTV due to the News5 coverage of Pope Francis's visit to the Philippines.

Additional Game 7 crew:
Trophy presentation: Nikko Ramos
Dugout celebration interviewer: Sel Guevara

References

External links
PBA official website

2015
2014–15 PBA season
San Miguel Beermen games
Alaska Aces (PBA) games
PBA Philippine Cup Finals